Cuca may refer to:

People
Cuca (footballer, born 1963), former Brazilian football player, and manager
Cuca (footballer, born 1991), Cape Verdean footballer
Cuca (band), a Mexican rock group

Places
Cuca, Argeș, a commune in Argeș County, Romania
Cuca, Galați, a commune in Galaţi County, Romania
Cuca, another name for the upper course of the Râul Târgului in Argeș County, Romania
Cuca, a tributary of the Bistrița in Vâlcea County, Romania
Cucá, a community in Tixpéhual Municipality, Yucatán, Mexico

Other
Cuca (beer), an Angolan brand of beer
Cuca Records, a former record label in Sauk City, Wisconsin, United States
Coco (folklore) or cuca, a monster in Lusophone and Hispanophone folklore

The acronym CUCA can stand for:
Cambridge University Conservative Association, a Conservative political society for students at Cambridge University, England
Charlotte United Christian Academy, a private Christian school in Charlotte, North Carolina, United States

See also 
Cuco (disambiguation)
Cucueți (disambiguation)
 Cucuieți (disambiguation)